Mark Tedeschi,  (born 1952) is an Australian barrister, law professor, photographer and author. He is in private practice at Wardell Chambers in Sydney. He was formerly the Senior Crown prosecutor for New South Wales and the Head of Chambers of the 100 or so Crown prosecutors. He was the founder and president of the Australian Association of Crown Prosecutors and is a visiting professor at the University of Wollongong. As a prosecutor, Tedeschi was best known for the prosecution of numerous high-profile cases in Australia, including the backpacker murders committed by Ivan Milat in the 1990s. He has won numerous awards for his photography and has been featured in galleries throughout the world, including in the State Library of New South Wales, the New South Wales Art Gallery, the Center for Fine Art Photography in Colorado, and the National Library in Canberra.

Early life and education

Tedeschi earned a Bachelor of Laws degree from the University of Sydney in 1974 and was then admitted as a solicitor in New South Wales. He later received a Master of Arts in Business Law, specialising in International Banking, Trade and Taxation Law from the London Metropolitan University (then the City of London Polytechnic), where he also served as a part-time Lecturer in Law.

Professional career

Legal career

Tedeschi became a Barrister in 1977. He was a defence barrister during the (so called) "Greek Conspiracy Case" in 1979–81 in which over 100 people, the majority of whom were of Greek origin, were arrested and charged with defrauding Social Security. The case sparked a documentary entitled Witch Hunt that premiered at the 1987 Sydney Film Festival. He was appointed a Crown Prosecutor in 1983, a Queen's Counsel in 1988, a Deputy Senior Crown Prosecutor in 1990, and the Senior Crown Prosecutor in 1997. He resigned as a Crown Prosecutor in February 2018, making him the longest serving Crown Prosecutor and Senior Crown Prosecutor in the State's history.

During his career as a prosecutor, he worked on numerous high-profile cases in New South Wales. Tedeschi prosecuted the backpacker murders committed by Ivan Milat in the 1990s,in which a total of seven bodies were discovered in the Belanglo State Forest in New South Wales. Milat was later arrested and found guilty of all murders on 27 July 1996. Milat later appealed the conviction, but it was upheld.

Tedeschi successfully prosecuted Chew Seng Liew and Choon Tee Lim for the 1991 shooting death of prominent Australian heart surgeon Victor Chang. On 4 July 1991, Chang was forced to pull his vehicle over by Liew and Lim and they attempted to rob him. After pulling over, Chang refused to give Liew and Lim his money. An argument ensued and Liew fired two shots, killing Chang. A third suspect was granted immunity for testifying against Liew and Lim. The original plan was to abduct Chang for ransom, however, the third suspect backed out of the plan the day before the shooting.

In 2001, he prosecuted family-murderer Sef Gonzales. Tedeschi was the lead prosecutor in a trial arising out of the infamous 2000 Fijian coup d'état led by George Speight. In 2004, he prosecuted then vice-president Jope Seniloli for falsely swearing in of ministers. He also won convictions against Deputy Speaker of the House of Representatives Rakuita Vakalalabure, as well as Ratu Viliame Volavola, PeceliRinakama, and Viliame Savu for the similar offences. All were sentenced to various prison terms.

In 2007, Tedeschi was the Counsel Assisting the Coroner during the Inquest into the deaths of five Australian journalists at Balibo in East Timor. Dubbed the Balibo Five, all were killed on 16 October 1975 during the Indonesian incursions prior to the main invasion of East Timor. The deaths were found to have been deliberate at the Inquest by an Australian coroner, who ruled that they were killed by Indonesian special forces soldiers. The incident was the subject of the 2009 film Balibo which won several awards.

Tedeschi prosecuted Phuong Ngo for the assassination of New South Wales Member of Parliament John Newman. This was the first political assassination in modern Australia's history and the trial ended in two mistrials before Ngo was found guilty of the murder in 2001. Ngo was a rival politician to Newman.

Other notable cases prosecuted by Tedeschi include:
 Tim Anderson & Evan Pederick
 Arthur "Neddy" Smith
 Philip Bell
 Kathleen Folbigg
 Sef Gonzales
 Bruce Burrell
 Dr Suman Sood
 Jeffery Gilham
 Shirley Justins & Caryn Jenning
 Gordon Wood
 Thomas Sam and Manju Sam
 David Whitby
 Desmond Campbell
 Keli Lane
 Walter Marsh
 Simon Gittany
 Robert Xie
 Adeel Khan
 Amirah Droudis
 Dr Brian Crickitt
 Phillip Nguyen
 Malcolm Naden
 Roger Dean
 Mitchell and Fiona Barbieri
 Anthony Waterlow

Controversies as a prosecutor

In 1991, the New South Wales Court of Criminal Appeal made criticism of Tedeschi in acquitting Tim Anderson of charges related to the 1978 Hilton Hotel bombing. Chief Justice Murray Gleeson said, in a unanimous judgement: "The trial of the appellant miscarried principally because of an error which resulted in large part from the failure of the prosecuting authorities adequately to check aspects of the Jayewardene theory. This was compounded by what I regard as an inappropriate and unfair attempt by the Crown to persuade the jury to draw inferences of fact, and accept argumentative suggestions, that were not properly open on the evidence. I do not consider that in those circumstances the Crown should be given a further opportunity to patch up its case against the appellant. It has already made one attempt too many to do that, and I believe that, if that attempt had never been made, there is a strong likelihood that the appellant would have been acquitted."

Tim Anderson told ABC television that the Legal Aid Commission of NSW, acting for him, laid almost 50 complaints against Tedeschi to the NSW Bar Council. "None of it came to anything."

Tedeschi was also criticised as a prosecutor in 2012 by the NSW Court of Criminal Appeal in the Gordon Wood trial. In acquitting Gordon Wood over the alleged murder of Caroline Byrne, the appeal judges found he relied on fiction and dangerous reasoning in the Wood case. Chief Judge Peter McLellan made numerous critical references to Tedeschi's presentation of evidence, concluding: "The difficulties which the prosecutor's conduct created are so significant that I am satisfied it caused the trial to miscarry occasioning a miscarriage of justice. The fundamental problem with the course taken by the prosecutor was that both generally and with respect to particular questions the prosecutor reversed the onus of proof."

Subsequently, Wood lodged complaints against Tedeschi to the New South Wales Bar Association, which were all dismissed.

In December 2017, Tedeschi wrote two email messages to state prosecutors, arguing that some of his colleagues were making inappropriate concessions to the defence. He said that the key role of a Crown prosecutor was "to act as a contradictor". The Bar Council responded that Tedeschi's messages had presented a "fundamental misunderstanding of the independent role of Crown prosecutors, as mere agents, rather than independent counsel". A DPP media release agreed with the main points of the Bar Council's statement. Tedeschi resigned as Senior Crown Prosecutor in February 2018, having announced his resignation in October 2017.

Academic career

From 1974 to 1975, Tedeschi served as a lecturer in law at the London Metropolitan University. At that time, it was known as the City of London Polytechnic. He was a part-time lecturer while earning his master's degree.

In 1975 he was appointed as a lecturer in law at the Kuring-Gai College of Advanced Education (subsequently part of the University of Technology Sydney).

In 2005, he was appointed as a Visiting Professorial Fellow at the University of Wollongong.

Photography

Tedeschi is a well-known photographer. He has had fifteen solo exhibitions and participated in over twenty group exhibitions in Australia, Italy, France, and the United States.[2] His images are included in the State Library of New South Wales, the Art Gallery of New South Wales, the National Library of Australia in Canberra, the Museum of Sydney, the Justice and Police Museum, the State Library of New South Wales (which has over 200 of his images), the Centre for Fine Art Photography in Colorado USA, and many private collections.

Tedeschi has been a judge of photographic competitions including the New South Wales Parliamentary Photography Prize. He frequently lectures on photography to camera clubs, the Art Gallery Society, and community groups. Tedeschi is a member of the board of directors of the National Art School in Sydney and a Trustee of Sydney Grammar School. He is a former artist-in-residence at Sydney Grammar School.

Bibliography

Tedeschi is the author of several books, including one on international business law which he co-authored in 1980: Law of International Business in Australia with Dr. P.J. O'Keefe. A book of his photographs was published by Beagle Press in 2012 entitled Shooting Around Corners, which featured over twenty-five years of his photography.

Tedeschi is the author of three true-crime books. The first was Eugenia, published in 2012 by Simon & Schuster Australia, which tells the story of Eugenia Falleni.

The second book was Kidnapped: the Crime that shocked a Nation, published by Simon & Schuster Australia in 2015. This book is the story of the kidnapping and murder of 8-year-old Graeme Thorne in 1960.

The third was Murder at Myall Creek: The Trial that defined a Nation published by Simon & Schuster Australia in 2016. This is the story of the trial of 10 European men and one African man who were charged with the murder of 28 Aboriginal Australians in 1838, and the prosecutor, John Hubert Plunkett who conducted their trial.

Awards and recognitions

Tedeschi has been a four time finalist in the National Photographic Portrait Prize at the National Portrait Gallery in Canberra as well as the Contemporary Photographic Prize, the "Head On" Photographic Portrait Prize at the Australian Centre for Photography, and the Photographic Portrait Prize at the National Portrait Gallery in London.

In 2009 Tedeschi was made a Cavaliere Ordine al Merito della Repubblica Italiana or Knight of the Order of Merit of the Italian Republic. In 2013 he was announced a Member of the Order of Australia (AM), for significant service to the law as a prosecutor, and to photography.

References

External links
 

1952 births
Living people
Australian barristers
20th-century Australian photographers
21st-century Australian photographers
Photographers from New South Wales
Lawyers from Sydney
University of Sydney alumni
Alumni of London Metropolitan University
Members of the Order of Australia
Australian non-fiction crime writers
Australian King's Counsel